Arthur Patrick Veltman (March 24, 1906 – October 1, 1980) played pro baseball from 1926 to 1934. He played for the Chicago White Sox, New York Giants, Boston Braves, and Pittsburgh Pirates. He never played as a starter, the most at bats he collected in one season was 28 in 1934. The other seasons he had less than 4 at-bats, in three seasons he only had 1 at-bat. His career batting average was .132 (5-for-38). His career fielding percentage was 1.000, with no errors in 33 total chances.

Sources

1906 births
1980 deaths
Major League Baseball catchers
Chicago White Sox players
New York Giants (NL) players
Boston Braves players
Pittsburgh Pirates players
Baseball players from Alabama
Oakland Oaks (baseball) managers